Dust and Dirt is the fifth studio album by New Zealand reggae band The Black Seeds released on 8 April 2012. 
The album's first single, "Pippy Pip" was released on 28 February 2012. 
Dust and Dirt was self-recorded and produced by The Black Seeds in their Wellington studio and released on digital, CD, and limited edition heavy weight 12" double gatefold vinyl formats.

Track listing 
 "Out of Light" - 4:02
 "Dust and Dirt" -4:43
 "Pippy Pip" - 3:42
 "Wide Open" -5:27
 "The Bend" -4:55
 "Loose Cartilage" -4:14
 "Frostbite" -4:58
 "Gabriel's Strut Dub" - 3:04
 "Love Me Now" - 3:57
 "Cracks in Our Crown" - 3:43
 "Don't Turn Around" - 4:21
 "Settle Down" -4:22
 "Rusted Story" -4:10
 "Settle Dub" (Bonus Digital Track) - 4:19

Release history

References

2012 albums
The Black Seeds albums
Easy Star Records albums
Albums produced by Michael Goldwasser